A championship belt is a large, extravagantly designed belt used primarily in combat sports such as boxing, mixed martial arts, and professional wrestling to signify the champions of the promotion or company, much like a cup or trophy in other sports. There are several companies in the business of constructing championship belts.

Early history
The first belt given as a prize for accomplishments within the ring was presented in 1810 by King George III to bare-knuckle boxer Tom Cribb, after he defeated Tom Molineaux, an American former slave.

Boxing
In boxing, the individual organizations such as the World Boxing Council, the World Boxing Association, the International Boxing Federation, and the World Boxing Organization each have their own unique championship belt that are awarded to the champions of each weight class.  Boxers strive to win the belt of all four organizations to unify their weight divisions. The Ring also created a championship system that is "intended to reward fighters who, by satisfying rigid criteria, can justify a claim as the true and only world champion in a given weight class".

Champions maintain permanent possession of these belts even upon losing their title, with a new belt made when a new champion is crowned.

Professional wrestling

One of professional wrestling's first world championships was the World Greco-Roman Heavyweight Championship which was created in 1875. The American Heavyweight Championship was created in 1881 as catch wrestling became the dominant style in the US. The historic World Heavyweight Wrestling Championship was created in 1905 to identify the best catch as catch can wrestler in the world. These championships were originally contested for in legitimate matches until the sport's gradual shift to predetermined works in the 1920s. 

Modern day professional wrestling is a form of entertainment which combines athletics and theatrical performance in a mimicry of combat sports. Many storylines center around the promotion's championships, which are represented by championship belts similar to those in boxing. The top title in a major promotion is usually designated a "world heavyweight championship".  Other, lesser championships may carry regional names, be limited to a specific weight class, or be defended in other special circumstances, such as the traditional tag team match.  

Typically, pro wrestling title belts have a unique design for each title, in contrast with boxing and mixed martial arts (MMA) where the title belts of a given sanctioning body are all the same design. The Big Gold Belt design, for example, is very recognizable and has been used by various wrestling promotions since the 1980s. 

In 2016, WWE began to streamline their championships, making their top male and female championships have the same design, similar to boxing and MMA. The only differences between them are the colors (to represent if the title belongs to either the Raw or SmackDown brand), the name on the belt, and the women's belts are smaller. The tag team championships also have the same design between each other with the only difference being the color of the straps.

Mixed martial arts

Mixed martial arts generally follows the boxing model of each sanctioning group, which is also a promotion, awarding its champion in each weight class a championship belt. As in boxing, the design of each promotion's belts are the same regardless of weight class, and the champion keeps their belt after losing the title.

Motorsports
The Las Vegas Motor Speedway has often used a championship belt for some race winners in lieu of a traditional trophy, owing to combat sport in the city.

Other sports

Historically, championship belts were also awarded to the winner of professional golf tournaments. Rodeo tournaments also award special belts, among other prizes.

References

  

+
Professional wrestling championships
Award items